Alex Aragon (born March 11, 1979) is an American professional golfer.

Aragon was born in Mexico City, Mexico. He played college golf at Stanford University. He turned professional in 2001.

Aragon played on the Web.com Tour in 2005, 2009, and 2012–2013. He won his first tournament in 2012 at the TPC Stonebrae Championship. He won his second tournament at the 2013 WNB Golf Classic.

Aragon played on the PGA Tour in 2006 where his best finish was T-27 at the 84 Lumber Classic. He has also played on mini-tours, including the Tight Lies Tour in 2003 and the Gateway Tour in 2004. He finished ninth on the 2013 Web.com Tour regular season money list to earn his 2014 PGA Tour card. In 2013–14, he made only 2 cuts in 18 events and finished 252nd on the FedEx Cup points list and lost his PGA Tour card.

Professional wins (2)

Web.com Tour wins (2)

See also
2005 PGA Tour Qualifying School graduates
2013 Web.com Tour Finals graduates

References

External links

American male golfers
PGA Tour golfers
Korn Ferry Tour graduates
Golfers from San Diego
American sportspeople of Mexican descent
Sportspeople from Mexico City
1979 births
Living people